The Orchard Residences, a 56-storey, high-rise residential condominium, completed in 2010 is the residential component of an integrated retail and residential development by Orchard Turn Developments Pte Ltd, a joint venture between CapitaLand and Sun Hung Kai Properties.

Located along the prime shopping district of Singapore on Orchard Road.  The tower is the tallest building along the shopping district, and has 175 residential units from the ninth to the 54th floor, with four penthouse apartments. During the first phase of the sale, 98 units were sold for an average of S$3213 per sq ft.

ION Orchard shopping mall, the retail component completed together with the project, has 335 food and retail outlets.

See also
Orchard Road
Orchard MRT station

References

External links
ION Orchard website
The Orchard Residences website
360 X 360 degrees interactive VR of the ION Orchard Building

Downtown Core (Singapore)
Orchard Road
Residential buildings completed in 2010
2010 establishments in Singapore
Residential skyscrapers in Singapore